K. M. Purushothaman was an Indian civil servant and administrator. He was the administrator of Mahe from  12 December 1988 to 22 April 1991.

References 

Living people
Indian civil servants
Year of birth missing (living people)